One Day International (ODI) cricket is played between international cricket teams who are Full Members of the International Cricket Council (ICC) as well as the top four Associate members. Unlike Test matches, ODIs consist of one inning per team, having a limit in the number of overs, currently 50 overs per innings – although in the past this has been 55 or 60 overs. ODI matches are a subset of List A cricket and so records and statistics are recorded both for specifically for ODIs and within List A. The earliest match recognised as an ODI was played between England and Australia in January 1971; since when there have been over 4,000 ODIs played by 28 teams. The frequency of matches has steadily increased, partly because of the increase in the number of ODI-playing countries, and partly as the cricket boards of those nations seek to maximise their revenue with the increased popularity of cricket, a process that dates from the time of the Packer Revolution.
In ODIs playing 200  matches is considered to be a significant achievement. Allan Border of Australia was the first cricketer to have reached this landmark. 
 
Sachin Tendulkar of India has played in most ODIs, having represented India in 463 matches.

As of 2 March 2021, 83 cricketers have reached this landmark, including 15 from India, the most among all ODI-playing nations.

Players with 200+ ODI matches

Following is the list of cricketers who have played 200 or more ODI matches.

By country

References

Lists of cricketers
One Day International cricket records